Byblos District (transliteration: Qadaa' Jbeil), also called the Jbeil District (Jbeil is Lebanese Arabic for "Byblos"; standard Arabic Jubail), is a district (qadaa) of the Keserwan-Jbeil Governorate of Lebanon. It is located to the northeast of Lebanon's capital Beirut. The capital is Byblos. The rivers of al-Madfoun and Nahr Ibrahim form the district's natural northern and southern borders respectively, with the Mediterranean Sea bordering it from the west and Mount Lebanon from the east, separating it from the adjacent district of Baalbek in the Beqaa Valley.

Demographics
The district's population is predominantly Maronite Catholic, followed by a Shia Muslim minority community. The largest towns of the district are predominantly inhabited by Maronites; notably Byblos, Qartaba, Aqoura and Amsheet. Most Shia Muslims live in the villages of Almat, Ras Osta, Hjoula and Bichtlida, and in the jurd highlands of Lassa, Afqa and Mazraat es-Siyad. A Greek Orthodox minority forms part of the population and is spread among several villages know locally as qornet el-roum (the corner of the Greek Orthodox). The villages that make up qournet el-roum are Mounsef, Jeddayel, Helwe, Berbara, Gharzouz, Rihanneh and Chikhane.

Byblos District has three seats allocated to it in the Lebanese Parliament. Two of these seats are allocated to Maronite Catholics, while the other seat is allocated to Shia Muslims. As of 2009, the religious make-up of the Byblos District's 75,584 voters were roughly 80% Maronite Catholic, 5% Shia Muslim and 5% Greek Orthodox.

Landmarks and sights

The Byblos District rises from 0 to 2,300 meters above sea level in the north. "Jabal el-Mnaitra" is also in the district, and said to have an altitude of 2,911/2,807 meters above sea level, but this isn't confirmed. 
Moreover, The District hosts a number of significant sites. The capital Byblos is an important historical and archaeological site boasting Phoenician, Roman, and Crusader ruins. The mountain village of Aannaya hosts the Saint Maroun-Aannaya monastery and the Catholic shrine of Saint Charbel (1828-1898), the first Lebanese saint (officially canonized by Pope Paul VI in 1977), both significant religious Maronite Christian holy sites. The village of Laqlouq, which has an altitude of 1,750 meters to 2,000 meters, is a ski resort. The village of Afqa contains the Afqa grotto, which is the source of the Nahr Ibrahim, also known as the Adonis River. The village of Bentaël (also spelled Bintaael) contains the first protected area in Lebanon, established in 1981. The village of Jaj hosts surviving cedar trees from the ancient cedar forests from which cedar wood was exported to Egypt and later to Jerusalem. The village Chikhane is considered the birthplace of the first Russian school in the Middle East, believed to have been established during World War I. The village of Hjoula is among the very rare villages in Lebanon to contain fossilized sea animals in it, along the village of Haqel. Byblos District also has a notable beach life with many public and private resorts existing along the seaside.

Towns and villages

 Aabaydat
 Almat el-Chmaliyeh
 Almat el-Jnoubiyeh
 Amsheet
 Annaya
 Aqoura
 Adonis
 Afqa
 Ain ed-Delbeh
 Ain el-Ghouaybeh
 Ain Jrain
 Ain Kfaa
 Bazyoun
 Bchilleh
 Beer el-Hit
 Behdidat
 Bejjeh
 Bekhaaz
 Berbara
 Beithabbak
 Bichtlida
 Bentaël
 Birket Hjoula
 Blat
 Boulhos
 Brayj
 Byblos
 Chatine
 Chikhane
 Chmout
 Edde
 Ehmej
 Fatreh
 Ferhet
 Fghal
 Fidar
 Ghabat
 Ghalboun
 Gharzouz
 Ghorfine
 Habil
 Halat
 Haqel
 Hay el-Arabeh
 Hbaline
 Hboub
 Hdayneh
 Hjoula
 Hosrayel
 Hsarat
 Hsoun
 Jaj
 Janneh
 Jeddayel
 Jenjol
 Jlisseh
 Jouret El Qattine
 Kafr
 Kfar Baal
 Kfar Hitta
 Kfar Kiddeh
 Kfar Masshoun
 Kfar Qouas
 Kfoun
 Laqlouq
 Lassa
 Lehfed
 Maad
 Majdel
 Marj
 Mastita
 Mayfouq
 Mazarib
 Mazraat es-Siyad
 Mechane
 Mghayreh
 Mish Mish
 Mounsef
 Nahr Ibrahim
 Qahmez
 Qartaba
 Qartaboun
 Qorqraiya
 Ram
 Ramout
 Ras Osta
 Rihaneh
 Seraaita
 Souaneh
 Tartej
 Tourzaiya
 Yanouh
 Zebdine

References

 
Districts of Lebanon